East Bay Newspapers, also called Phoenix-Times Publishing Company, is a publisher based in Bristol, Rhode Island, United States, and owner of seven weekly newspapers in eastern Rhode Island and southeastern Massachusetts. Office hours are Monday through Friday 8:00 a.m. to 4:00 p.m.

History 
East Bay began with the Bristol Phoenix, founded by William H. S. Bayley in 1837. Current owner Matthew Hayes is descended from Roswell S. Bosworth Sr., who took over the paper in 1929. The company's Web presence debuted in 1998.

Publications 
East Bay Newspapers publishes seven newspapers in Rhode Island, spanning Bristol, Newport and Providence counties, and two in Bristol County, Massachusetts. News bureaux are maintained in Rhode Island at 1 Bradford Street, Bristol, Rhode Island.

Barrington Times Based in Bristol, the Times has covered Barrington, Rhode Island, since 1958. Its newsstand cost is one dollar.

Bristol Phoenix The company's flagship paper, the Phoenix is based in and covers Bristol, Rhode Island. It was founded in 1837 and now costs one dollar.

East Providence Post The Post, based in Bristol, covers East Providence, Rhode Island. It is a free newspaper.

Portsmouth Times Based in Bristol, the Portsmouth Times covers Portsmouth. It is a free newspaper.

Sakonnet Times Based in Tiverton, the Sakonnet Times has covered Little Compton, and Tiverton, Rhode Island, since 1967. It costs one dollar.

Warren Times-Gazette Based in Bristol and covering Warren, Rhode Island, the Times-Gazette was founded in 1961 and costs one dollar.

Westport Shorelines Based in Tiverton, Westport Shorelines was founded in 1994 to cover Westport, Massachusetts. It costs 75 cents.

East Bay formerly published a weekly in Middletown and Newport, Rhode Island, called Newport This Week. The paper, founded in 1972, was sold to former employee Tom Shevlin in 2011 after he had left to start a news website, Newport Now, in 2009.

References

External links
 EastBayRI.com: East Bay Newspapers website

Newspaper companies of the United States
Newspapers published in Massachusetts
Newspapers published in Rhode Island
Mass media in Bristol County, Massachusetts
Newport County, Rhode Island
Companies based in Rhode Island